Hamish is a Scottish masculine given name. It is the anglicized form of the vocative case of the Gaelic name Seamus or Sheumais. It is therefore, the equivalent of James.

People

Given name
 Hamish Bennett, retired New Zealand cricketer
 Hamish Bennett (director), New Zealand filmmaker 
 Hamish Blake (born 1981), Australian comedian and radio presenter
 Hamish Bond (born 1986), New Zealand Olympic rower
 Hamish Bowles (born 1963), European editor-at-large for Vogue
 Hamish Brown, writer and mountain walker 
 Hamish Carter (born 1971), Olympic gold medallist triathlete from New Zealand
 Hamish Clark, Scottish actor
 Hamish Forbes, 7th Baronet (1916–2007), British Army major 
 Hamish Glencross (born 1978), heavy metal guitarist for the band My Dying Bride
 Hamish Henderson (1919–2002), Scottish singer and collector of folk music 
 Hamish Imlach (1940-1996), Scottish folk singer
 Hamish Kilgour, New Zealand musician in the band The Clean
 Hamish Linklater, American actor
 Hamish MacCunn (18681916), Scottish composer and musician 
 Hamish Marshall (born 1979), New Zealand cricketer
 Hamish McAlpine (born 1948), Scottish footballer
 Hamish MacDonald (disambiguation), several people 
 Hamish McKay, New Zealand television presenter
 Hamish Milne, British pianist
 Hamish Moore, Scottish maker, musician and teacher
 Hamish Peacock Australian athlete
 Hamish Pepper New Zealand sailor
 Hamish Purdy, Canadian movie set decorator
 Hamish Rosser, drummer of Australian band the Vines
 Hamish Rutherford (born 1989), New Zealand cricketer
 Hamish Stuart (born 1949), lead singer of Average White Band
 Hamish Wilson, Scottish actor

Nickname
 James Hamish Dawson (19252007), Scottish rugby union player
 Jamie Hamilton (publisher) (19001988), founder of the publishing house Hamish Hamilton Limited
 James Hamish Kemp (19332002), Scottish rugby union player
 Thomas Hamish Mahaddie (19111997), Scottish officer in the Royal Air Force during the Second World War
 James Hamish Stothard (19131997), Scottish middle-distance runner

Animals
 Hamish McHamish, famous "cat about town" in St Andrews, Scotland

Fictional characters
 Hamish Alexander, in the Honorverse novels by David Weber
John H. Watson, a character in Sherlock Holmes stories; his middle name is unknown in the original stories, but is given as Hamish in many non-canon Holmes pastiches and adaptations
 Hamish and Dougal, comedy characters from Radio 4 series I'm Sorry I Haven't a Clue
 Hamish Macbeth, a detective in series of novels and television adaptation starring Robert Carlyle as the eponymous hero
 Hot Shot Hamish and Mighty Mouse, two former popular British football-themed comic strips
 Hamish, in the Nickelodeon TV show Mr. Meaty

Named cyclones
Cyclone Hamish, a 2009 cyclone
Tropical Cyclone Hamish, a 1999 cyclone

References

English-language masculine given names
Scottish masculine given names
Lists of people by nickname